Gilzem is a municipality in the district of Bitburg-Prüm, in Rhineland-Palatinate, western Germany.

References

External links
 private website from and dedicated to Gilzem

Bitburg-Prüm